The mottled eagle ray (Aetomylaeus maculatus) is a species of fish in the family Myliobatidae.

Description
The mottled eagle ray can grow up to 78 cm in disc width. Little is known about this species, but based on similar species it is expected to produce an average of 4 offspring per year. It has an exceptionally long spineless tail which is over six times longer than the body

Range
It is found in China, India, Indonesia, Malaysia, Singapore, Sri Lanka, Taiwan, and Thailand. Its natural habitats are open seas, shallow seas, subtidal aquatic beds, and estuarine waters.

References

External links
 Species Description of Aetomylaeus maculatus at www.shark-references.com

Aetomylaeus
Fish described in 1832
Taxa named by John Edward Gray
Taxonomy articles created by Polbot